A.P.E.X is a 1994 science fiction action film directed by Phillip J. Roth and starring Richard Keats, Mitchell Cox, Lisa Ann Russell, and Marcus Aurelius. The plot concerns a group of scientists who explore the past using robotic probes known as the A.P.E.X or "Advanced Prototype Exploration units".

Plot
In 2073, Nicholas Sinclair is a scientist on a time travel project. An accident introduces in 1973 a deadly virus that activates the project's automatic countermeasures. Attack robots are sent to the past in an effort to eliminate the virus carriers. They fail. Sinclair returns to 2073 to find the Earth in ruins, ravaged by both the virus and the robots still in countermeasure action. Sinclair returns to the project lab that is now in ruins in order to prevent the original cause of the accident.

Cast
 Richard Keats as Nicholas Sinclair
 Mitchell Cox as Shepherd
 Lisa Ann Russell as Natasha Sinclair
 Marcus Aurelius as Taylor
 Adam Lawson as Rasheed
 David Jean Thomas as Dr. Elgin
 Brian Richard Peck as Desert Rat
 Anna B. Choi as Mishima
 Kristin Norton as Johnson
 Jay Irwin as Gunney
 Robert Tossberg as 1973 Father
 Kathleen Randazzo as 1973 Mother (as Kathy Lambert)
 Kareem H. Captan as Joey
 Merle Nicks as Old Man
 Natasha Roth as Desert Child

Accolades
A.P.E.X was nominated for Best Film in the International Fantasy Film Award, at the 1994 Fantasporto international film festival in Porto, Portugal.

See also
 Landmaster

References

External links
 Film review at Badmovies.org
 
 

1990s science fiction action films
1994 films
Android (robot) films
American robot films
American science fiction action films
Apocalyptic films
1990s English-language films
American post-apocalyptic films
Films set in the 2070s
Films about time travel
Fiction set in the 2070s
Films set in 2073
Films directed by Phillip J. Roth
1990s American films